Trudovi Reservy Stadium is  a football stadium in Bila Tserkva, Ukraine. The stadium is a home arena for FC Arsenal-Kyivshchyna Bila Tserkva. Following the 2022 Russian invasion of Ukraine, the fate of the stadium was unknown.

References

Football venues in Ukraine
Sport in Bila Tserkva
Sports venues in Kyiv Oblast
Buildings and structures in Bila Tserkva